The Kingdom of Kaffa was a kingdom located in what is now Ethiopia from 1390 to 1897, with its first capital at Bonga. The Gojeb River formed its northern border, beyond which lay the Gibe kingdoms; to the east the territory of the Konta and Kullo peoples lay between Kaffa and the Omo River; to the south numerous subgroups of the Gimira people, and to the west lay the Majangir people. The native language, also known as Kaffa, is one of the Omotic group of languages.

Kaffa was divided into four sub-groups, who spoke a common language Kefficho, one of the Gonga/Kefoid group of Omotic languages; a number of groups of foreigners, Ethiopian Muslim traders and members of the Ethiopian Church, also lived in the kingdom. There were a number of groups of people, "but with the status of submerged status", who also lived in the kingdom; these included the Manjo, or hunters; the Manne, or leatherworkers; and the Qemmo, or blacksmiths. The Manjo even had their own king, appointed by the King of Kaffa, and were given the duties of guarding the royal compounds and the gates of the kingdom.  The kingdom was overrun and conquered in 1897, and was eventually annexed by Ethiopia.

The land where this former kingdom lay is in the southern parts of the Ethiopian Highlands with stretches of forest. The mountainous land is very fertile, capable of three harvests a year.

History 

The Kingdom of Kaffa was founded c.1390 by Minjo, who according to oral tradition ousted the Mato dynasty of 32 kings. However, his informants told Amnon Orent, "no one remembers the name of a single one." The first capital Bonga was either founded or captured by Bon-noghe; it was later replaced by Anderaccha, but Bonga retained its importance.

During the 16th century, the Emperor of Ethiopia Sarsa Dengel convinced the kingdom to officially accept Christianity as its state religion. As a result, the church of St. George was dedicated at Baha; the building preserved a tabot bearing the name of Emperor Sarsa Dengel. Over the following centuries the influence of the Ethiopian government grew weak, and Christianity more or less disappeared, although the church of St. George was used as a "male house of ritual of George" until late in the 19th century when Christian practices were reintroduced.

Beginning with Gali Ginocho (1675–1710), the kings of Kaffa began to expand the borders of their kingdom, annexing the neighboring small Gimira states of She, Benesho and Majango. The neighboring state of the Welayta came under their control in the reign of Tato Shagi Sherocho (1775–1795), who extended the boundaries of his kingdom as far as the Omo to the southeast and almost to the confluence of the Omo and the Denchya to the south. It was during the reign of King Hoti Gaocho (1798–1821), that the territory of the Kaffa kings reached its maximum. According to Orent, the traditions of the Kaffa people relate that he ruled far and wide, conquering wherever he went, even as far afield as Wolleta and Kambaata. "To this day," concludes Orent, "some people still talk about the time that their ancestors defeated all their enemies and sat at the foot of a famous tree in Wolliso and decided not to go farther into Shoa province."

Around the 18th century the kingdom was invaded by the Mecha Oromos. But due to its difficult terrian, Kaffa was able to repel the invasion. However all territories north of the Gojeb river was lost to the Oromos.

The last Kaffa king, Gaki Sherocho, resisted for months the combined armies of Wolde Giyorgis, Ras Damisse, and King Abba Jifar II of Jimma, until he was captured 11 September 1897, and was first sent to Ankober, then to Addis Ababa. Kaffa was then held as a fief by Wolde Giyogis until 1914. During his visit to Kaffa in 1897, Alexander Bulatovich had the opportunity to study the culture of the inhabitants, describing them in his book With the Armies of Menelik II, emperor of Ethiopia, identifying a number of practices in common with the more familiar Amhara people.

After the annexation into Ethiopia, the inhabitants suffered greatly due to the slave-raids organized by Abba Jifar II, and the region almost became uninhabited. During the reorganization of the provinces in 1942, the former kingdom was enlarged by the addition of a number of other kingdoms from the Gibe region to become Kaffa Province.

Economy 

In Kaffa, Maria Theresa thalers (MT) and salt blocks called amoleh were used as currency (as in the rest of Ethiopia) as late as 1905, which circulated at a rate of four or five amolehs to 1 MT.

The economy was based on exports of gold, civet oil, and slaves. Crops grown included coffee and cotton. However, according to Richard Pankhurst, the amount of coffee exported was never large: he cites an estimate for its production in the 1880s at 50,000 to 60,000 kilograms a year. Livestock was raised, and honeybees kept in barrels (called gendo) which were hung in trees.

See also 
 Monarchies of Ethiopia (king list)
 Getachew Abate

Notes

Further reading 
 Jon Abbink, 'Käfa ethnography', in S. Uhlig, ed., Encyclopaedia Aethiopica (Wiesbaden: Harrassowitz), vol. 3, 2007, pp. 327–329.
 Jon Abbink, 'Käfa history', in S. Uhlig, ed., Encyclopaedia Aethiopica, (Wiesbaden: Harrassowitz), vol. 3, 2007, pp. 322–324.
 Jon Abbink, 'Gaki Sherocho, Käfa king'. In: E.K. Akyeampong & H.L. Gates Jr., eds, Dictionary of African Biography, vol. 2, pp. 410–411. New York: Oxford University Press. 
 Werner Lange, History of the Southern Gonga (Southeastern Ethiopia). Wiesbaden: Franz Steiner, 1982.

External links

Former monarchies of Africa
History of Ethiopia
States and territories established in the 1390s
States and territories established in 1897
14th-century establishments in Africa
1897 disestablishments in Africa
2nd millennium in Ethiopia